Ocobaya is a location in the La Paz Department in Bolivia. It is the seat of the Ocobaya Canton, one of the five cantons of the Chulumani Municipality in the Sud Yungas Province. At the time of census 2001 it had 269 inhabitants.

References

External links 
 Population data and map of Chulumani Municipality

Populated places in La Paz Department (Bolivia)